Investigating censors were Censorate officials in imperial China's civil bureaucracy between the Sui (581–618) and Qing (1644–1912) dynasties. They were in charge of investigations and impeachment, including duties such as:
 gather complaints from the people
 review the handling of prisoners
 impeach officials for misconduct

Since the Yuan dynasty, investigating censors were also authorized to submit remonstrances or suggestions about the emperor's conduct or policies.

References 

 

Obsolete occupations
Government of Imperial China